Karen Price (known posthumously as Little Miss Nobody) was a 15-year-old Welsh murder victim who disappeared in 1981. After the discovery of her body in 1989, British facial reconstruction artist Richard Neave used her skull to create a model of her physical appearance. The reconstruction and the matching of DNA in the body to that of Price's parents allowed her body to be identified. The case was cited as one of the first instances in which DNA technology was used in this way.

Discovery and identification
In 1989, in Cardiff, Wales, two construction workers unearthed a rolled carpet while installing a garden behind a house. When the carpet was unrolled, the skeletal remains of a young female were revealed. Entomologists studied insect eggs around the discovery site and determined that the girl had been dead for approximately 10 years. When early efforts to identify the body failed, Richard Neave of Manchester University created a clay facial reconstruction of the skull. This reconstruction, along with a comparison of DNA samples from the victim and Price's parents, made the identification possible.

The police concluded that Price had run away from home and turned to prostitution. In 1991, Idris Ali and Alan Charlton, who were alleged to have managed her solicitation as a prostitute, were charged with her murder. Ali's charge was eventually reduced to manslaughter, and he was released in 1994. Charlton is still serving a life sentence.

Review of convictions
In February 2014, the Criminal Cases Review Commission, the public body responsible for investigating alleged miscarriages of justice in England, Wales, and Northern Ireland, referred Charlton's conviction to the Court of Appeal, stating that there was a "real possibility" that the conviction could be overturned. In March 2015, the commission also referred Ali's conviction to the appeal court, stating, "There is a real possibility the Court of Appeal will conclude that the conviction is unsafe because of the risk of the prosecution amounting to an abuse of process". It was disclosed that a number of officers from the South Wales Police who were involved in the investigation of Price's murder had also worked on the Lynette White and Philip Saunders murder inquiries, in which six men were wrongfully convicted. Other sources of concern in the Price case, according to the commission, included breaches of the Police and Criminal Evidence Act 1984 (PACE) and the PACE Code of Practice, which govern the detention, treatment, and questioning of persons by police officers; the credibility of the prosecution witnesses; "oppressive handling by the police of key witnesses"; and the "veracity of Mr. Ali's guilty plea".

In 2016, both men's appeals were dismissed at the Court of Appeal in London.

See also
List of solved missing person cases

References

Cited works and further reading
 
 
 Murray, Elizabeth A. (2012). Forensic Identification: Putting a Name and Face on Death. Twenty-First Century Books. 
 Palmer, Trisha (1994). Real-Life Crimes: Forensic Mysteries. Chancellor Press. pp. 5–11. 

1980s in Cardiff
1980s missing person cases
1981 in Wales
1981 murders in the United Kingdom
1989 in Wales
Crime in Cardiff
Deaths by person in Wales
Female murder victims
Formerly missing people
Incidents of violence against girls
Incidents of violence against women
Missing person cases in Wales
Murder in Wales
Violence against sex workers in the United Kingdom
Violence against women in Wales